Blame it All on My Roots: Five Decades of Influences is the fourth compilation box set by American country music artist Garth Brooks, released by Pearl Records on November 28, 2013.

The 8-disc set, sold exclusively through Walmart and Sam's Club stores, includes 77 songs on six compact discs, plus 33 music videos, and a full-length live performance from the Garth at Wynn residency show in Las Vegas, on two DVDs. Four of the CDs are new studio albums composed entirely of cover songs. The remaining two CDs and the DVD in the set are a reissue of The Ultimate Hits.

Content
Loosely modeled from the set list of his residency show, Garth at Wynn, the albums feature songs Brooks attributes to the development of his unique country pop genre. They were produced by Mark Miller, with additional production from Steve Buckingham on "Shout." Allen Reynolds produced The Ultimate Hits.

Commercial success
The album debut at number 3 on the Billboard Top 200 chart with 164,000 copies from fewer than four days of sales and reached number 1 in its second week with 146,000 marking his ninth top album on the chart. As of September 10, 2014, has sold 893,000 copies in the United States. The RIAA lists individual Platinum certifications for the compilation with Country Classics, listed as Country Hits in the RIAA database, Classic Rock, The Melting Pot and Blue-Eyed Soul.

Track listing

Personnel

 Jill Dell'Abate – background vocals 
 Pat Alger – acoustic guitar, background vocals
 Bob Babbitt – bass guitar
 Sam Bacco – percussion
 Bob Bailey – background vocals
 Al "Shaggy" Barclay – background vocals 
 Eddie Bayers – drums, handclapping, keyboards, percussion 
 DeWayne Blackwell – background vocals
 Bruce Bouton – steel guitar, background vocals 
 Tim Bowers – background vocals 
 Jimmy Bowland – saxophone
 Garth Brooks – choir, acoustic guitar, electric guitar, handclapping, lead vocals, background vocals 
 Sandy Brooks – background vocals 
 Stephanie C. Brown – background vocals 
 Tom Bukovac – acoustic guitar, electric guitar
 Dennis Burnside – horn arrangements, string arrangements 
 Sam Bush – fiddle, mandolin
 Shawn Camp – acoustic guitar 
 David Campbell – string arrangements 
 Mark Casstevens – acoustic guitar, electric guitar
 Mike Chapman – bass guitar, handclapping, background vocals 
 Kathy Chiavola – choir, background vocals 
 Johnny Christopher – acoustic guitar 
 Charles Cochran – string arrangements 
 Allie Colleen – background vocals
 Chad Cromwell – drums, percussion 
 Jerry Douglas – dobro
 Bob Doyle – background vocals 
 Stuart Duncan – fiddle, mandolin
 Earl of Bud Lee – background vocals 
 The Englands – background vocals 
 Béla Fleck – banjo
 Pat Flynn – acoustic guitar 
 Paul Franklin – steel guitar
 Dave Gant – background vocals 
 Steve Gibson – acoustic guitar, electric guitar
 Carl Gorodetzky – string contractor
 Barry Green – trombone
 Charles Green – handclapping 
 Tracy Greenwood – handclapping 
 Rob Hajacos – fiddle, background vocals 
 Vicki Hampton – background vocals 
 Joe Harris – background vocals 
 Mike Haynes – trumpet
 Dan Heins – background vocals 
 John Hobbs – keyboards
 Jim Horn – saxophone 
 Jon Mark Ivey – background vocals 
 John Barlow Jarvis – keyboards 
 Wendy Johnson – choir, background vocals 
 Rusty Jones – background vocals 
 Gordon Kennedy – acoustic guitar, electric guitar, background vocals 
 Steve King – background vocals 
 Wayne Kirkpatrick – acoustic guitar, background vocals 
 Jennifer Kummer – french horn
 Chris Leuzinger – acoustic guitar, electric guitar
 Sam Levine – saxophone 
 Pam "The Chick" Lewis – background vocals 
 Terry McMillan – harmonica
 Kenny Malone – drums, percussion
 Blair Masters – keyboards 
 Jimmy Mattingly – fiddle
 Edgar Meyer – upright bass
 Joey Miskulin – accordion
 Mark Miller – handclapping 
 Doug Moffet – saxophone, soloist
 Buddy Mondlock – background vocals 
 Steve Morley – background vocals 
 Farrell Morris – percussion
 Jonell Mosser – background vocals 
 The Nashville String Machine – strings
 Jim Ed Norman – string arrangements 
 Jennifer O'Brien – choir, background vocals 
 Mike Palmerman – background vocals 
 Billy Panda – acoustic guitar, electric guitar
 Steve Patrick – trumpet
 Wayland Patton – choir, background vocals 
 Brian Petree – background vocals 
 Dale Pierce – background vocals 
 Jon Randall – background vocals 
 Michael Rhodes – bass guitar
 Karyn Rochelle – background vocals 
 Chris Rodriguez – background vocals 
 Jim Rooney – background vocals 
 Tami Rose – background vocals 
 John Wesley Ryles – background vocals 
 Lee Sartin – background vocals 
 Lisa Silver – background vocals 
 Milton Sledge – drums, percussion 
 Jimmie Lee Sloas – bass guitar 
 Kira Small – background vocals 
 Chris Stapleton – background vocals 
 Morgane Hayes-Stapleton – background vocals 
 Charley Stefl – background vocals 
 Scott Stem – background vocals 
 Bryan Sutton – acoustic guitar, electric guitar, mandolin
 Daniel Tashian – background vocals 
 Vaneese Thomas – background vocals 
 Fonzi Thornton – background vocals 
 Steve Wariner – acoustic guitar, background vocals 
 Bergen White – string arrangements, background vocals 
 Hurshel Wiginton – choir, background vocals 
 Bobby Wood – handclapping, keyboards, background vocals 
 Glenn Worf – bass guitar
 Trisha Yearwood – choir, background vocals 
 Curtis Young – choir, background vocals 
 Reggie Young – acoustic guitar, electric guitar

Chart performance

Weekly charts

Year-end charts

References

2013 compilation albums
Garth Brooks compilation albums